Cycloramphus is a genus of frogs in the family Cycloramphidae. The genus is endemic to the southeastern Brazil. They are sometimes known as the button frogs.

Species
There are 28 species:

References

 
Cycloramphidae
Amphibians of South America
Endemic fauna of Brazil
Taxonomy articles created by Polbot